Summer Scars is a 2007 British thriller film produced and directed by Julian Richards. It is based on a hostage situation that Richards experienced during his childhood. The cast includes Kevin Howarth, Ciaran Joyce, Amy Harvey, Darren Evans, Jonathan Jones, Chris Conway, Ryan Conway and Chole Parfitt.

Plot 
Six youths ditch school for the woods, where some hotrodding on a stolen moped changes the fate of their day. They crash into Peter, a dishevelled drifter, who is delighted to have a group of teens to hang out with. First he gains their trust by joining in their games, but then his behaviour changes. Peter uses what he has learned about the kids against them, bullying the alpha boys, belittling the weaker ones and saving his worst for the only girl in the group. Realising too late that they are being held hostage, the kids are forced to embrace the dark side of human nature in order to survive the ordeal.

Cast 
 Kevin Howarth as Peter
 Ciaran Joyce as Bingo
 Amy Harvey as Leanne
 Darren Evans as Jonesy
 Jonathan Jones as Paul
 Chris Conway as Ben
 Ryan Conway as Mugsey
 Chole Parfitt as Scott

Release 
The film had a limited UK theatrical release in 2009 by the Institute of Contemporary Arts (ICA) in their screening season for 'New British Cinema'. In 2008, Summer Scars was released on DVD in North America by TLA Releasing on their Danger After Dark label. In 2009, the film was released on DVD in the UK by Soda Pictures. Other DVD distributors include MIG Film GmbH (German speaking Europe), MCF Megacom (Former Yugoslavia), Wide Pictures (Spain), Sahamongkol Film International (Thailand) and Viswas (India).

Reception 
Rotten Tomatoes, a review aggregator, reports that 70% of ten surveyed critics gave the film a positive review; the average rating was 5.6/10. The site's consensus reads: "This low budget British psycho-thriller packs plenty of atmospheric tension and suspense into its slender running time." Summer Scars has been linked with other, roughly contemporaneous, films that deal with concerns over "Broken Britain" and a fear of "hoodies", including Harry Brown, Eden Lake, The Disappeared, Outlaw, The Great Ecstasy of Robert Carmichael and Heartless.

Kurt Dahlke of DVD Talk rated it 4/5 stars and called it "lean, mean, disturbing and deftly crafted". Josh Winning of Total Film rated it 3/5 stars and called it a "bare-boned tween nightmare" that is a combination of Stand by Me and Eden Lake. Nigel Floyd of Time Out London rated it 3/5 stars and wrote, "An inexperienced cast don't always make the most of a slippery, unsettling script". Andrew Pulver of The Guardian rated it 2/5 stars and wrote, "There's not much to recommend in this putative hoodie horror from Julian Richards, which takes the inverse position to Eden Lake."

Awards

References

External links 
 

2007 films
2007 thriller films
British thriller films
2000s English-language films
2000s British films